Enniskillen was a constituency of the Parliament of Northern Ireland.

Boundaries
Enniskillen was a county constituency comprising the northern part of County Fermanagh. It was created in 1929, when the House of Commons (Method of Voting and Redistribution of Seats) Act (Northern Ireland) 1929 introduced first-past-the-post elections throughout Northern Ireland. The constituency survived unchanged, returning one member of Parliament until the Parliament of Northern Ireland was temporarily suspended in 1972, and then formally abolished in 1973.

Politics
Enniskillen had a unionist majority, but a substantial nationalist minority. The seat was consistently won by the Ulster Unionist Party candidate, and it was only contested on four occasions: in 1938 by an Independent Unionist Association candidate, in 1949 by a Nationalist candidate, in 1965 by a Liberal candidate and in 1969 by both the People's Democracy and an independent Unionist candidate.

Members of Parliament

Elections

At the 1929 and 1933 general elections, Edward Archdale was elected unopposed.

At the 1945 Northern Ireland general election, Erne Ferguson was elected unopposed.

At the 1949 Enniskillen by-election and the 1953 Northern Ireland general election, Thomas Charles Nelson was elected unopposed.

At the 1954 Enniskillen by-election and the 1958 and 1962 general elections, Harry West was elected unopposed.

 Parliament prorogued 30 March 1972 and abolished 18 July 1973

References

Northern Ireland Parliament constituencies established in 1929
Constituencies of the Northern Ireland Parliament
Historic constituencies in County Fermanagh
Northern Ireland Parliament constituencies disestablished in 1973